The common name emerald spreadwing is used for several species of damselflies in the family Lestidae:

Lestes dryas
Lestes viridulus